Suairlech ind Eidnén mac Ciaráin (or Suairlech) (died 4 December 870) was an Irish abbot and bishop. Little is known about him, but he is mentioned in the Annals of Inisfallen  as the abbot of Bennchor. He was also known to have been Abbot of Clonard at somepoint during the 9th century.

References

9th-century Irish abbots
870 deaths
9th-century Irish bishops
Year of birth unknown